The Dutch National Mountain Bike Championships are held annually to decide the cycling champions the mountain biking discipline, across various categories.

Men

Cross-country

Cross-country eliminator

Marathon

Beach race

Women

Cross-country

Cross-country eliminator

Marathon

Beach race

References

Cycle races in the Netherlands
Recurring sporting events established in 1988
1988 establishments in the Netherlands
National mountain bike championships
Mountain biking events in the Netherlands